Asura Balbalta (stylized as AsuRa BalBalTa) is the seventh studio album by South Korean hip-hop duo Leessang. The album was released on August 25, 2011. The album contains 13 songs.

Track listing

Award
 Cyworld Digital Music Awards Song of the Month – "I Turned Off the TV…"

References

2011 albums
Korean-language albums
Leessang albums